The Kiawah were a constituent group of the Cusabo people, an alliance of indigenous groups in lowland regions of the coastal region of what became Charleston, South Carolina. When English colonists arrived and settled on the Ashley River, the neighboring Kiawah were friendly. 

The Kiawah and the Etiwan tribe were the two principle Cusabo tribes close to the Charleston Harbor. While some other South Carolinian lowland tribes were not consistently associated with the Cusabo, the Kiawah were consistently a part of the Cusabo. The first record of Kiawah Cusabo alliance membership was in a 1707 agreement, in which the Kiawah was assuredly mentioned. However, by 1682, disease and warfare is said to have reduced Kiawah numbers to about 160.

Cultural Features

Geography 
The Kiawah lived on or near the Ashley River from 1598-1682 and then on Kiawah Island from 1682-1695. Though the location of this is now unknown, the Kiawah were granted a land request for a reservation south of the Combahee River.

Language 
In 1605 and 1609 a Spanish colonizer employed a native of Santa Elena who spoke Spanish and was able to translate the language of the Kiawah. The Kiawah, along with other members of the Cusabo, ranged in territory throughout lowland region, and it is presumed that the Cusabo tribes spoke similar, if not the same language, referred generally as the Cusaboan language.

American Linguist Blair Rudes proposed that Arawakan interpretations of the name ending -bo corresponds to the naming of locations associated with the Cusabo tribes including the Kiawah, but there has been no solid proof confirming this linguistic relationship.

Colonizer Arrival 
Attempted settlements were made in the area by the French in 1562 and the Spaniards beginning in 1566. After being driven out in 1576, the Spanish returned and burned most if not all of the Cusabo villages of the Cusabo and the Guale. In 1598 the Kiawah and Escamacu raided Guale. During the Yamsee War, the Kiawah fought with the English against the Yamasee, Creek, Cherokee, Catawba and other nations seeking revenge for abuse by traders.

The Cassique of Kiawah was a term to refer to the chieftain or tribal leader. The Cassique negotiated relations with English settlers to improve trade relations, foster peace and tranquility, and cultivate an alliance with the English for the sake of protection.

English settler Robert Sanford wrote in his 1666 recollections that a Kiawah tribe member known by the title of Cassique welcomed him earnestly to the Kiawah "assuring [him] a broad deep entrance, and promising a large welcome and plentiful entertainment and trade." Supposedly it was the Cassique's pride for his country that encouraged the English to solidify the creation of their settlement.

Another English settler, Nicolas Carteret, recorded his travels from Bermuda to the Ashley (Kiawah) river in a later. His visit to the Port Royal (Charleston Harbor area was due to the fact that a settlement had been constructed there in April of 1670. A Kiawah native called Cassique assisted in the travels of Cartaret, who remarked that he was "a very ingenious Indian, and a great linguist."

Census Information 
By 1682, the date of the earliest census, the number of bowmen for the Kiawah tribe had been reduced to 40, with the total Cusabo population at an estimated 664. By the time of the 1715 census, the total Cusabo population excluding the Etiwan was said to be 535: 95 men and 200 children. Severe population depletion is said to be attributed to smallpox and other diseases in combination with attacks by the Spaniards and Indian allies of the French. However, descendants of the Kiawah people are still living today.

Kiawah Island, South Carolina, bears their name today.

References

Indigenous peoples of the Southeastern Woodlands
Native American tribes in South Carolina